Lotto Sport Italia is an Italian sports equipment manufacturer based in Trevignano, near Treviso. The company manufactures and commercialises sporting and casual clothing and footwear (including sneakers, and football boots). Its clothing line includes T-shirts, jackets, shorts, and leggings and goalkeeper gloves.

History
Lotto was established in 1939 by the Caberlotto family (who were the owners of the football team F.C. Treviso) in Montebelluna, northern Italy, the world centre of footwear manufacturing. In June 1973, Lotto made its debut as a sports footwear manufacturer. Tennis shoes signaled the beginning of production, followed by models for basketball, volleyball, athletics and football.

Sports clothing was the company's next venture. In the first ten years, Lotto focused on the Italian market. During its first decade, corporate strategy concentrated on making tennis footwear and clothing, and early on sponsored big names from the professional tennis circuit (Martina Navratilova, Boris Becker, Thomas Muster, Andrea Gaudenzi).

In the 1980s, Lotto moved on to broaden its business base by competing among the then-small group of manufacturers of football boots and clothing. Lotto began to create its first football boot models and signed major collaboration agreements with internationally renowned players and teams. Tennis players John Newcombe, Andrés Gómez and José Luis Clerc wore the brand's tennis products.

The first sponsorship agreements in football were signed with players (Dino Zoff and Ruud Gullit) and teams, such as Milan (1993–98), the Dutch national team, Napoli (1994–97), Juventus (2000–03), Chievo and Spanish club Real Zaragoza. Professional footballers provided input in both the design and fine-tuning of the products. This involvement together with the athletes' public images helped make the company a leader in tennis and football. During this same period, Lotto expanded into the export market, and its international business grew rapidly. Ten years later, the brand was being distributed in more than 60 countries around the world.

In June 1999, the company was taken over a group of local business people who were already very active in the sports area. It was headed by Andrea Tomat, who took on the role of President and CEO of the new company. The company was renamed Lotto Sport Italia and its new owners focused on the brand’s strengths of dynamism, innovation, quality, Italian design, passion and an extremely effective customer service program.

Today, Lotto distributes its products in more than 70 countries through independent sports stores, specialty chain stores and large stores with sports departments; the brand used on wristwatches is Lotto Time. The company is pushing the development of corner and flagship stores, which are now widespread in Italy and in other countries.

Distribution

Lotto distributes its products in over 110 different countries through independent sports article stores, specialized chain-stores and large stores with specialized sports departments. Special emphasis is placed on monobrand stores (flagship stores, street stores, factory outlets) as well as corners and shop-in-shops.

Sponsorships are an important part of Lotto’s business. In addition to its latest agreement with USPTA and its technical partnerships with the ATP, WTA Tour and Wimbledon, Lotto is visible at all  Grand Slam tournaments and championship series and has been a part of the Italian Open for more than 30 years. More than 120 professional players now wear the “double diamond” logo, including the No. 1-ranked women’s doubles team of Virginia Ruano Pascual and Paola Suarez.

Sponsorship

Football

National teams

   (from 2022)

Club teams

  San Martín de San Juan (From 2024 season)
  Pardubice
  Racing Club TPO  (From 2022-2023 season)
  Atlético Bucaramanga
  Deportivo Cuenca
  El Nacional
  Dijon FCO
  HKU23
  Shillong Lajong F.C.
  Hapoel Hadera F.C.
  Maccabi Netanya F.C.
  Sektzia Ness
  Arzignano Valchiampo
  U.S.D. Città di Fasano
  Luparense
  Monza
  Kedah FA
  Sabah FC 
  Perak FC
  Perlis United
  Southern United
  Waitakere United
  Sportivo Luqueño
  Cusco FC
  Sport Huancayo
  Universidad Técnica de Cajamarca
  Wigry Suwałki
  Maritzburg United
  Konyaspor
  Kramatorsk

Tennis

 Sumit Nagal
 Bradley Mousley
 John Millman
 David Ferrer
 Carla Suarez Navarro
 Agnieszka Radwańska
 João Sousa
 Kevin Anderson
 Lloyd Harris
 Viktor Troicki
 Lesia Tsurenko
 Elise Mertens
 Kateřina Siniaková
 Kristýna Plíšková
 Jiří Veselý
 Alize Cornet
 Ons Jabeur
 Petra Martić
 Aisam-ul-Haq Qureshi
 Dennis Novak
 Jule Niemeier
 Tomás Barrios Vera

Esports
 Team Empire

See also

 Sergio Tacchini

References

External links 

 

Athletic shoe brands
Sporting goods manufacturers of Italy
Italian brands
Sportswear brands
Clothing companies established in 1973
Italian companies established in 1973
Shoe brands
Shoe companies of Italy
Companies based in Veneto
1980s fashion
1990s fashion
2000s fashion
2010s fashion